An Kapou Kapote (Greek: Άν Κάπου Κάποτε; English: If Somewhere Sometime) is the title of the fourth studio album by the Greek artist Kostas Martakis, released on 23 December 2013 by Platinum Records in Greece and Cyprus.

Track listing

Release history

Personnel
Kostas Martakis – executive producer
Giorgos Kalfamanolis – photography
Creative Cow – artwork

References

2013 albums
Greek-language albums
Kostas Martakis albums